The Defence Cyber Agency (DCyA) is a tri-service command of the Indian Armed Forces. Headquartered in New Delhi, the agency is tasked with handling cyber security threats. The DCyA draws personnel from all three branches of the Armed Forces. The head of the DCyA is an officer of two-star rank, and reports to the Chief of Defence Staff (CDS) through the Integrated Defence Staff (IDS).

Indian Navy Rear Admiral Mohit Gupta was appointed in May 2019 as the first head of the DCyA. The DCyA was expected to be operational by November 2019. As of 2021, DCyA is fully operational with Army, Air Force and Navy established their respective Cyber Emergency Response Teams (CERT).

History
The Naresh Chandra Task Force was set up in July 2011 by National Security Advisor Shivshankar Menon to review the recommendations of the Kargil Review Committee, assess the implementation progress and further suggest new reforms related to national security. The task force was led by Naresh Chandra, retired Indian Administrative Service officer, and comprised 13other members, including Gopalaswami Parthasarathy, Air Chief Marshal Srinivasapuram Krishnaswamy (Retd), Admiral Arun Prakash (Retd), Lt Gen V. R. Raghavan (Retd), Anil Kakodkar, K C Verma and V K Duggal. The committee conducted the first holistic review of national security since the Kargil Review Committee and submitted its classified report to Prime Minister Manmohan Singh on 23May2012. Among its recommendations, the Task Force recommended the creation of a cyber command (DCyA), an  aerospace command and a  special operations command. All three units were proposed to be tri-service commands in order to bring the various special forces units of the military under a unified command and control structure.

The creation of the Defence Cyber Agency (DCyA), the Defence Space Agency (DSA), and the Armed Forces Special Operations Division (AFSOD) were approved by Prime Minister Narendra Modi during the Combined Commanders' Conference at Jodhpur Air Force Station on 28 September 2018. The existing Defence Information Assurance and Research Agency will be upgraded to form the new Defence Cyber Agency.

Area of responsibility
The Week reported that the DCyA would have the capability to hack into networks, mount surveillance operations, lay honeypot, recover deleted data from hard drives and cellphones, break into encrypted communication channels, and perform other complex objectives. According to Lieutenant General Deependra Singh Hooda, the DCyA will have the responsibility of framing a long-term policy for the security of military networks, which includes eliminating the use of foreign hardware and software in the Indian Armed Forces, and preparing a Cyberwarfare doctrine.

See also 
 Integrated Defence Staff, tri-services command at strategic level composed of MoD, MEA and tri-services staff
 Joint warfare, general concept
 List of cyber warfare forces of other nations

References

 
Ministry of Defence (India)
Government agencies established in 2018
2018 establishments in India
Joint military units and formations of India